Demetrius Hopkins (born October 10, 1980 in Philadelphia, Pennsylvania, U.S.) is an American boxer who fought in the light welterweight division.

Career
As an amateur, Hopkins was the 1999 National Golden Gloves Light welterweight champion.

Hopkins won the USBA light-welterweight championship when he beat Mario Jose Ramos by a unanimous decision.

On June 7, 2006 Hopkins had a knockout win against Michael Warrick.

Hopkins beat The Contender TV reality show star Steve Forbes on March 17, 2007, in a unanimous decision.

Hopkins fought twice more in 2007, beating Jailer Berrio with a first round knockout in July and Enrigay Colin by a unanimous decision.

Hopkins fought in a December 23, 2012 against WBO junior welterweight champion Danny "El Parches" Hernandez and lost by split decision. Hopkins is the nephew of former undisputed middleweight & light heavyweight champion Bernard Hopkins.

References

External links

 

1980 births
Living people
African-American boxers
Boxers from Philadelphia
Light-middleweight boxers
Light-welterweight boxers
American male boxers
21st-century African-American sportspeople
20th-century African-American people